Francisco Morales Nieva (29 December 1924 – 10 November 2016) was a Spanish playwright.

Born in Valdepeñas, he moved to Madrid at an early age to train at the San Fernando Royal Academy of Fine Arts. He was a member of the avant-garde literary movement called Postismo. Between 1948 and 1963, he lived in Paris where his acquaintances included modernists such as Ionesco and Beckett. His first published work Es bueno no tener cabeza appeared in 1971. A past winner of the Asturias Award, he was considered to be a leading candidate for the Cervantes Prize.

Nieva was elected to Seat J of the Real Academia Española on 17 April 1986, he took up his seat on 29 April 1990.

Awards
 National Theatre Award (1980)
 Asturias Award for Literature (1992)
 National Drama Literature Award (1992)
 Gold Medal for Merit in Fine Arts (1996)
 Madrid Region Culture Award (2007)
 Corral de Comedias Award at the Almagro Festival (2010)

Works

References

1924 births
2016 deaths
Members of the Royal Spanish Academy
People from the Province of Ciudad Real
Spanish dramatists and playwrights
Spanish male dramatists and playwrights
Spanish male writers